Tekchand Sharma is a member of the Haryana Legislative Assembly from the Bahujan Samaj Party representing the Prithla constituency in Faridabad district of Haryana.

References 

People from Faridabad district
Bahujan Samaj Party politicians from Haryana
Living people
Haryana MLAs 2014–2019
Year of birth missing (living people)
Bharatiya Janata Party politicians from Haryana